Aneityum (also known as Anatom or Keamu) is the southernmost island of Vanuatu, in the province of Tafea.

Geography
Aneityum is the southernmost island of Vanuatu (not counting the Matthew and Hunter Islands, which are disputed with New Caledonia, but considered by the people of Aneityum Island part of their custom ownership).

Its southeastern cape Nétchan Néganneaing is the southernmost point of land in Vanuatu, more southerly than the southern satellite islet Inyeug. The latter, however, is surrounded by Intao Reef, that extends even further south, albeit submerged, thus being the southernmost feature of Vanuatu.

The larger of its two villages is Anelcauhat ( Anelghowhat), on the south side.

Population
Aneityum had a population of 915 in 2009. This population is believed to have been between 9,000 and 20,000 prior to the arrival of the Europeans, in 1793. However, introduced diseases and blackbirding played a major role in Aneityum's massive depopulation, which left the island with less than 200 inhabitants in 1930.

The main language of Aneityum island is also called Aneityum, or Anejom̃ in the local orthography.

Traditional Chiefdoms 
Anau-Unse (Annaunse)
Ijipdav (Epege)
Anetcho (Aneitio)
Anau-Unjai (Aname)
Anumej-Anekro (Annuantchai)
Umej (Umetch)
Anelcauhat

The chiefdoms were further subdivided into more than 50 districts that were presided by minor chiefs. The power of the chiefs was mainly of ritual nature.

Maps

Transportation
The island is served by Anatom Airport, not on the main island itself, but on the tiny island to its south, Iñec (or Inyeug, also known as "Mystery Island"), across the main village, which has three weekly flights from Port Vila via Tanna.

References

External links

 Vanuatu Tourism Office

Islands of Vanuatu
Tafea Province